The 2018 VMI Keydets baseball team represents]ed the Virginia Military Institute during the 2018 NCAA Division I baseball season. The Keydets competed as a member of the Southern Conference, and were led by fourth-year head coach Jonathan Hadra. They played their home games out of Gray–Minor Stadium, as they have since 2007.

Personnel
VMI lost only one offensive starter from the 2017 season, that being right fielder Tyler Tharp, who hit .348 in 58 games and led the team with 143 total bases. Relief pitchers Blaine Lafin, Jack Gomersall, and Ryan Bennett were the only other seniors lost from the previous season. However, 
backup infielder Mason Adamson, backup catcher Garrett St. Laurent, and relievers John Fuqua and Liam Roden did not return to the team in 2018.

Returning Starters

Roster

Schedule

|-
! style="background:#FFF;color:#000000;" | Regular Season
|-

|- align="center" bgcolor="bbffbb"
| February 16 || at #19 South Carolina || Founders Park || 7–6 || D. Tremblay (1–0) || A. Hill (0–1) || M. Eagle (1) || 7,384 || 1–0 || –
|- align="center" bgcolor="ffbbbb"
| February 17 || at #19 South Carolina || Founders Park || 2–7 || C. Morris (1–0) || Z. Kent (0–1) ||  || 6,627 || 1–1 || –
|- align="center" bgcolor="ffbbbb"
| February 18 || at #19 South Carolina || Founders Park || 0–9 || R. Chapman (1–0) || B. Watts (0–1) ||  || 6,612 || 1–2  || –
|- align="center" bgcolor="bbffbb"
| February 20 || at #15  || Davenport Field || 9–4 || B. Barbery (1–0) || G. McGarry (0–1) ||  || 3,709 || 2–2 || –
|- align="center" bgcolor="bbffbb"
| February 23 ||  || Gray–Minor Stadium || 10–5 || J. Winder (1–0) || B. Kreyer (0–2) ||  || 233 || 3–2 || –
|- align="center" bgcolor="bbffbb"
| February 23 || Lafayette || Gray–Minor Stadium || 8–1 || Z. Kent (1–1) || J. Faraci (0–1) ||  || 132 || 4–2 || –
|- align="center" bgcolor="bbffbb"
| February 25 || Lafayette || Gray–Minor Stadium || 11–6 || C. Johnston (1–0) || J. Cain (0–1) ||  || 164 || 5–2 || –
|- align="center" bgcolor="ffbbbb"
| February 27 || at #14 Virginia || Davenport Field || 9–10 || D. Ortiz (1–0) || B. Barbery (1–1) || B. Sousa (2) || 3,177 || 5–3 || –

|- align="center" bgcolor="ffbbbb"
| March 3 ||  || Gray–Minor Stadium || 10–11 || J. Lee (1–2) || J. Winder (1–1) ||  || 198 || 5–4 || –
|- align="center" bgcolor="bbffbb"
| March 3 || Oakland || Gray–Minor Stadium || 11–1 || Z. Kent (2–1) || N. Parr (0–2) ||  || 78 || 6–4 || –
|- align="center" bgcolor="bbffbb"
| March 4 || Oakland || Gray–Minor Stadium || 11–8 || M. Eagle (1–0) || C. Bowers (0–3) ||  || 188 || 7–4 || –
|- align="center" bgcolor="ffffff"
| March 6 || at  || Pitt Field || colspan=7| Postponed to Apr. 18
|- align="center" bgcolor="ffbbbb"
| March 9 ||  || Gray–Minor Stadium || 4–8 || J. Riley (1–2) || J. Winder (1–2) || C. Metelski (1) || 99 || 7–5 || –
|- align="center" bgcolor="ffbbbb"
| March 10 || UMass Lowell || Gray–Minor Stadium || 5–9 || A. Ryan (1–1) || Z. Kent (2–2) ||  || 244 || 7–6 || –
|- align="center" bgcolor="bbffbb"
| March 10 || UMass Lowell || Gray–Minor Stadium || 6–3 || K. Staats (2–0) || H. Funaro (1–3) || M. Eagle (2) || 112 || 8–6 || –
|- align="center" bgcolor="ffbbbb"
| March 14 || at  || Bud Metheny Baseball Complex || 4–19 || H. Gregory (2–0) || B. Barbery (1–2) ||  || 361 || 8–7 || –
|- align="center" bgcolor="bbffbb"
| March 16 || at  || Barcroft Park || 9–7 || C. Johnston (1–0) || T. Swiggart (3–1) || M. Eagle (3) || 128 || 9–7 || –
|- align="center" bgcolor="ffbbbb"
| March 17 || at George Washington || Barcroft Park || 5–8 || A. Wheeler (1–0) || Z. Kent (2–3) || I. Pasteur (1) || 124 || 9–8 || –
|- align="center" bgcolor="ffbbbb"
| March 18 || at George Washington || Barcroft Park || 2–4 || N. Woods (1–2) || K. Staats (2–1) || I. Pasteur (2) || 188 || 9–9 || –
|- align="center" bgcolor="ffffff"
| March 20 ||  || Gray–Minor Stadium || colspan=7| Postponed to Mar. 27
|- align="center" bgcolor="ffbbbb"
| March 23 || at  || UNCG Baseball Stadium || 1–9 || M. Frisbee (4–0) || J. Winder (1–3) ||  || 528 || 9–10 || 0–1
|- align="center" bgcolor="ffbbbb"
| March 23 || at UNC Greensboro || UNCG Baseball Stadium || 3–6 || A. Wantz (3–0) || M. Eagle (1–1) ||  || 576 || 9–11 || 0–2
|- align="center" bgcolor="bbffbb"
| March 25 || at UNC Greensboro || UNCG Baseball Stadium || 8–7 || N. Eaton (1–0) || J. Maynard (4–2) ||  || 486 || 10–11 || 1–2
|- align="center" bgcolor="ffbbbb"
| March 27 || Radford || Gray–Minor Stadium || 6–8 || A. Nardi (2–2) || D. Tremblay (1–1) || C. Higgerson (2) || 67 || 10–12 || –
|- align="center" bgcolor=""
| March 28 ||  || Gray–Minor Stadium || colspan=7| Cancelled
|- align="center" bgcolor="ffbbbb"
| March 30 || The Citadel || Gray–Minor Stadium || 0–5 || D. Spence (2–2) || J. Winder (1–4) ||  || 188 || 10–13 || 1–3
|- align="center" bgcolor="bbffbb"
| March 31 || The Citadel || Gray–Minor Stadium || 12–3 || Z. Kent (3–3) || A. Bialakis (2–3) ||  || 323 || 11–13 || 2–3

|- align="center" bgcolor="bbffbb"
| April 1 || The Citadel || Gray–Minor Stadium || 12–4 || K. Staats (3–1) || J. Merritt (2–3) || M. Eagle (4) || 239 || 12–13 || 3–3
|- align="center" bgcolor="bbffbb"
| April 3 || at  || Bolding Stadium || 12–6 || E. Byrd (1–0) || E. Harp (1–4) ||  || 198 || 13–13 || –
|- align="center" bgcolor="ffbbbb"
| April 4 || at James Madison || Eagle Field || 3–4 || S. Perkins (3–0) || M. Eagle (1–2) ||  || 421 || 13–14 || –
|- align="center" bgcolor="bbffbb"
| April 6 || at  || Thomas Stadium || 8–7 || C. Johnston (2–0) || M. Kaczor (2–3) || N. Eaton (1) || 316 || 14–14 || 4–3
|- align="center" bgcolor="ffbbbb"
| April 8 || at East Tennessee State || Thomas Stadium || 4–6 || R. Simpler (3–3) || D. Tremblay (1–2) || A. Maher (4) || 363 || 14–15 || 4–4
|- align="center" bgcolor="ffbbbb"
| April 8 || at East Tennessee State || Thomas Stadium || 3–7 || R. Koesters (2–0) || K. Staats (3–2) || J. Giambalvo (4) || 363 || 14–16 || 4–5
|- align="center" bgcolor="ffbbbb"
| April 10 || Longwood || Gray–Minor Stadium || 9–11 || Z. Potojecki (1–1) || S. Ewald (0–1) || J. Peterson (1) || 134 || 14–17 || –
|- align="center" bgcolor="bbffbb"
| April 11 || at VCU || The Diamond || 4–1 || B. Barbery (2–2) || B. Wilks (3–1) || M. Eagle (5) || 1,052 || 15–17 || –
|- align="center" bgcolor="bbffbb"
| April 13 ||  || Gray–Minor Stadium || 11–7 || J. Winder (2–4) || C. Walter (0–5) ||  || 251 || 16–17 || 5–5
|- align="center" bgcolor="bbffbb"
| April 14 || Western Carolina || Gray–Minor Stadium || 12–9 || D. Tremblay (2–2) || Z. Franklin (0–4) || N. Eaton (2) || 607 || 17–17 || 6–5
|- align="center" bgcolor="bbffbb"
| April 14 || Western Carolina || Gray–Minor Stadium || 5–4 || K. Staats (4–2) || T. Purus (1–8) || M. Eagle (6) || 202 || 18–17 || 7–5
|- align="center" bgcolor="bbffbb"
| April 18 || at Richmond || Malcolm U. Pitt Field || 11–2 || C. Johnston (3–0) || L. Schipper (0–2) ||  || 298 || 19–17 || –
|- align="center" bgcolor="bbffbb"
| April 20 ||  || Gray–Minor Stadium || 12–1 || J. Winder (3–4) || N. Verbeke (4–3) ||  || 1,077 || 20–17 || 8–5
|- align="center" bgcolor="bbffbb"
| April 21 || Furman || Gray–Minor Stadium || 13–7 || Z. Kent (4–3) || J. Beatson (1–2) ||  || 351 || 21–17 || 9–5
|- align="center" bgcolor="ffbbbb"
| April 22 || Furman || Gray–Minor Stadium || 1–19 || J. Bertrand (4–1) || K. Staats (4–3) ||  || 112 || 21–18 || 9–6
|- align="center" bgcolor="bbffbb"
| April 25 ||  || Gray–Minor Stadium || 9–7 || N. Eaton (2–0) || A. McDonald (1–6) ||  || 222 || 22–18 || –
|- align="center" bgcolor="bbffbb"
| April 27 || at  || Claude Smith Field || 4–1 || J. Winder (4–4) || A. Cox (6–3) ||  || 1,010 || 23–18 || 10–6
|- align="center" bgcolor="ffbbbb"
| April 28 || at Mercer || Claude Smith Field || 4–9 || S. Gipson (4–0) || M. Eagle (1–3) || N. Spear (5) || 811 || 23–19 || 10–7
|- align="center" bgcolor="ffbbbb"
| April 29 || at Mercer || Claude Smith Field || 3–11 || C. Vann (4–2) || K. Staats (4–4) ||  || 422 || 23–20 || 10–8

|- align="center" bgcolor="ffbbbb"
| May 1 || at Virginia Tech  || English Field || 3–8 || N. Enright (2–3) || E. Byrd (1–1) || A. McDonald (5) || 485 || 23–21 || –
|- align="center" bgcolor="bbffbb"
| May 2 || Old Dominion || Gray–Minor Stadium || 7–6 || Z. Kent (5–3) || H. Gregory (3–4) || M. Eagle (7) || 106 || 24–21 || –
|- align="center" bgcolor="bbffbb"
| May 11 ||  || Gray–Minor Stadium || 12–4 || J. Winder (5–4) || A. Scott (7–5) ||  || 266 || 25–21 || 11–8
|- align="center" bgcolor="ffbbbb"
| May 12 || Wofford || Gray–Minor Stadium || 4–8 || A. Higginbotham (6–3) || Z. Kent (5–4) ||  || 577 || 25–22 || 11–9
|- align="center" bgcolor="ffbbbb"
| May 13 || Wofford || Gray–Minor Stadium || 10–12 || A. Garcia (4–1) || N. Eaton (2–1) ||  || 231 || 25–23 || 11–10
|- align="center" bgcolor="ffbbbb"
| May 17 || at  || Joe Lee Griffin Stadium || 2–9 || J. Rich (4–5) || J. Winder (5–5) ||  || 209 || 25–24 || 11–11
|- align="center" bgcolor="ffbbbb"
| May 18 || at Samford || Joe Lee Griffin Stadium || 6–10 || H. Skinner (5–2) || Z. Kent (5–5) || W. Burns (10) || 281 || 25–25 || 11–12
|- align="center" bgcolor="bbffbb"
| May 19 || at Samford || Joe Lee Griffin Stadium || 8–2 || B. Barbery (3–2) || S. Jones (3–5) ||  || 331 || 26–25 || 12–12

|-
! style="background:#FFF;color:#000000;" | Postseason
|- 

|- bgcolor="ffbbbb"
| May 23 || No. 5 Mercer || Fluor Field • Greenville, SC || 0–19 (7) || A. Cox (7–3) || J. Winder (5–6) ||  || 219 || 26–26 || –
|- bgcolor="ffbbbb"
| May 24 || No. 1 UNC Greensboro || Fluor Field • Greenville, SC || 7–11 || B. Hensley (6–2) || B. Barbery (3–3) ||  || 212 || 26–27 || –

References

VMI
VMI Keydets baseball seasons
VMI